Agaraea insconspicua is a moth of the family Erebidae. It was described by William Schaus in 1910. It is found in Costa Rica.

References

Moths described in 1910
Phaegopterina
Moths of Central America